The men's 220 yards event at the 1938 British Empire Games was held on 7 and 10 February at the Sydney Cricket Ground in Sydney, Australia.

Medalists

Results

Heats
Held on 7 February

Qualification: First 3 in each heat (Q) qualify directly for the semifinals.

Semifinals
Held on 7 February

Qualification: First 3 in each heat (Q) qualify directly for the final.

Final
Held on 10 February

References

Athletics at the 1938 British Empire Games
1938